Kamensky (masculine), Kamenskaya (feminine), or Kamenskoye (neuter) is the name of several inhabited localities in Russia:

Urban localities
Kamensky, Krasnoarmeysky District, Saratov Oblast, a work settlement in Krasnoarmeysky District of Saratov Oblast

Rural localities
Kamensky, Belgorod Oblast, a khutor in Yakovlevsky District of Belgorod Oblast
Kamensky, Tatishchevsky District, Saratov Oblast, a settlement in Tatishchevsky District of Saratov Oblast
Kamensky, name of several other rural localities
Kamenskaya, Moscow Oblast, a village in Yegoryevsky District of Moscow Oblast
Kamenskoye, Kamchatka Krai, a selo in Penzhinsky District of Koryak Okrug of Kamchatka Krai
Kamenskoye, name of several other rural localities

Historical names
Kamenskaya, name of Kamensk-Shakhtinsky, a town in Rostov Oblast, in 1817–1927